Incarum is a genus of plants in the family Araceae. It has only one known species, Incarum pavonii, native to western South America (Ecuador, Peru, Bolivia).

References

Aroideae
Monotypic Araceae genera
Flora of South America